Carmelle Robert (born 1962) is a Quebec astrophysicist, starburst researcher and professor at the Department of Physics, Physical Engineering and Optics at Université Laval, in Quebec City, Quebec.

Biography 
Robert earned her undergraduate degree in physics from the University of Sherbrooke (1984), and her master's and a doctorate in astrophysics from, University of Montreal (1987, 1992 respectively). She also completed her postdoctoral fellowships including one with the Space Telescope Science Institute in Baltimore, Maryland (1991-1994).

As a graduate student, Robert investigated the wind clumps observed in the spectrum of the Cygnus Wolf-Rayet stars, using the Canada-France-Hawaii Telescope. As a postdoc at the Space Telescope Science Institute, she applied this expertise on massive stars to study starburst regions in distant galaxies in the ultraviolet light.

In 1995 she received a Women Faculty Award from the National Sciences and Engineering Research Council of Canada enabling her to return to Université Laval in Quebec. One of her grad students there was Laurie Rousseau-Nepton, the first indigenous woman in Quebec to obtain a Ph.D. in astrophysics.

For the academic year ending April 2018, she took a leave of absence to conduct research at the University of Hawaii, Hilo from September 2017 to April 2018.

Research 
Robert's research includes the characterization of the different generations of stars in galaxies and uses that information to understand the mechanisms that drive the evolution of galaxies. One of her key focus areas is known as a starburst region.

According to one report, "The peculiarity of the spectral signatures collected by Anne Pellerin and Carmelle Robert is due to the fact that they cover a light not visible to the naked eye, the distant ultraviolet, "a light associated with events of very high energy," specifies the student-researcher. Paradoxically, this type of light does not cross the Earth's atmosphere. To collect it, you must therefore go hunting it in its natural habitat, there it frolics freely: space. Since June 24, 1999, an exceptional tool for amassing this precious light has been circling the Earth."
As part of her research, Robert has developed a synthesis code, which can be used to "determine the right mixture of star spectra which will reproduce as faithfully as possible the spectral signature of distant galaxies in the manner of a painter who seeks the right dosage of pigments to obtain the desired color."

Supernova discovery 
On the night of February 9, 1996, Robert was part of a team of four astrophysicists from Université Laval to discover a supernova now called SN1996D, which is located in the galaxy NGC 1614, 250 million light years from Earth. Working with colleagues Laurent Drissen, Yvan Dutil and Jean-René Roy, the discovery was made at the Canada-France-Hawaii Astronomical Observatory, located at the top of Mauna Kea on the island of Hawaii. A paper about the event said, "SN1996D appeared suddenly following the explosion of a star whose mass would be about ten times that of the Sun." The supernova is not readily visible to the naked eye but using a quality telescope, amateur observers could expect to see it in dark skies.

Luminous blue variable star discovery 

In 1996, Robert was credited, along with two other astrophysicists, for the discovery of a new luminous blue variable star called NGC 2363-V1, which is located in the star-forming region NGC 2363, at the far southwestern part of the irregular galaxy called NGC 2366 in the  Camelopardalis constellation, in the northern celestial hemisphere. It is almost 11 million light years away from the Earth's galaxy. Working with Laurent Drissen and Jean-René Roy, the group discovered the new star after closely examining images taken by the Hubble Space Telescope Wide Field Planetary Camera.

Memberships 

 UL Astrophysics Research Group (GRAUL)
 Center for Research in Astrophysics of Quebec (CRAQ), Deputy Director
 Canadian Astrophysical Society (CASCA)
 Canadian Foundation for the International Space University (CFISU), Member, Board of Directors

Selected publications 
According to WorldCat.org, Robert has 13 works in 23 publications in 2 languages as of 2020.

 Leitherer, C., Schaerer, D., Goldader, J. D., Delgado, R. M. G., Robert, C., Kune, D. F., ... & Heckman, T. M. (1999). Starburst99: synthesis models for galaxies with active star formation. The Astrophysical Journal Supplement Series, 123(1), 3.
 Heckman, T. M., Robert, C., Leitherer, C., Garnett, D. R., & van der Rydt, F. (1998). The ultraviolet spectroscopic properties of local starbursts: implications at high redshift. The Astrophysical Journal, 503(2), 646.
 Drissen, Laurent; Roy, Jean-René; Robert, Carmelle (1997). A New Luminous Blue Variable in the Giant Extragalactic H II Region NGC 2363. The Astrophysical Journal. 474: L35. Bibcode:1997 ApJ...474L..35D. doi:10.1086/310417.
 Leitherer, C., Robert, C., & Heckman, T. M. (1995). Atlas of Synthetic Ultraviolet Spectra of Massive Star Populations. The Astrophysical Journal Supplement Series, 99, 173.
 Moffat, A. F., & Robert, C. (1994). Clumping and mass loss in hot star winds. The Astrophysical Journal, 421, 310-313.
 Robert, C., Leitherer, C., & Heckman, T. M. (1993). Synthetic UV Lines of Si IV, C IV, and He II from a Population of Massive Stars in Starburst Galaxies. The Astrophysical Journal, 418, 749.
 Robert, C., Moffat, A. F., Drissen, L., Lamontagne, R., Seggewiss, W., Niemela, V. S., ... & Tapia, S. (1992). Photometry, polarimetry, spectroscopy, and spectropolarimetry of the enigmatic Wolf-Rayet star EZ Canis Majoris. The Astrophysical Journal, 397, 277-303.
 Leitherer, C., Robert, C., & Drissen, L. (1992). Deposition of mass, momentum, and energy by massive stars into the interstellar medium. The Astrophysical Journal, 401, 596-617.
 Drissen, L., Robert, C., & Moffat, A. F. (1992). Polarization variability among Wolf-Rayet stars. VII-The single stars WR 14, WR 25, and WR 69. The Astrophysical Journal, 386, 288-292.
 Leitherer, C., & Robert, C. (1991). Observations of stellar winds from hot stars at 1.3 millimeters. The Astrophysical Journal, 377, 629-638.

References 

1962 births
Living people
Place of birth missing (living people)
Scientists from Quebec
Canadian astrophysicists
Women astrophysicists
Université de Montréal alumni
20th-century Canadian physicists
21st-century Canadian physicists
20th-century Canadian women scientists
21st-century Canadian women scientists
Academic staff of Université Laval